Robert Wunderlich is an American politician. He served as the 81st mayor of Beverly Hills, California.

Biography 
Wunderlich grew up the son of an electrician in Queens, New York. He then went on to study English and earned a B.A. in Chemistry from Columbia University on a scholarship from the electrician’s union, graduating in 1975. He then received a Masters in Physics and a Ph.D. in Chemical Physics from Harvard University.

Inspired by his wife, Andrea Spatz, who is a financial planner, Wunderlich earned an MBA in finance from UCLA and went on to found a financial consulting firm. He began his public service by serving as Beverly Hills' representative of the Metropolitan Water District of Southern California from 2007. In 2017, he won the race for City Councilman focusing on the city's infrastructure, environmental sustainability and transportation. Wunderlich won the race by a narrow margin of 18 votes. 

On April 6, 2021, he was installed as mayor of Beverly Hills, California in a virtual ceremony.

References 

People from Queens, New York
Columbia College (New York) alumni
Harvard Graduate School of Arts and Sciences alumni
UCLA Anderson School of Management alumni
Mayors of Beverly Hills, California